Hampton Wick railway station is in the London Borough of Richmond upon Thames, in south-west London, and is in Travelcard Zone 6. The suburb of Hampton Wick is on the opposite bank of the River Thames from Kingston upon Thames and lies at the eastern end of Hampton Court Park.

The station and all trains serving it are operated by South Western Railway.

History
The original station was opened by the London and South Western Railway on 1 July 1863: it was reconstructed in 1969. Platforms are above the street level ticket office. The ticket office is only open at peak times but tickets can be bought at other times from a ticket machine. The station is usually unstaffed. The journey time to London Waterloo is 30 minutes (via Wimbledon) or slightly longer via Richmond.

Accidents and incidents
On 6 August 1888, a light engine and a passenger train were in a head-on collision due to a signalman's error. Four people were killed and fifteen were injured.

On 18 June 1930 a baby boy was found in the First Class carriage of a train travelling from Waterloo by Mr Paul Broome, the railway guard. The baby was found with a note which indicated whoever left him contemplated suicide. The baby was taken to Kingston Hospital. CID investigated the issue but whoever left the baby was never found.

Services
The typical off-peak service from the station in train per hours is:

 6 to London Waterloo, of which:
 4 run via Wimbledon
 2 run via Richmond
 2 to 

The station features in the music video for Jamie T's single "Sticks 'N' Stones".

Connections
London Buses routes London Buses route 281, 285 and 641 serve the station.

References

External links

Former London and South Western Railway stations
Hampton Wick
Railway stations in the London Borough of Richmond upon Thames
Railway stations in Great Britain opened in 1863
Railway stations served by South Western Railway